Kultura Popullore (Folkloric Culture) is a quarterly magazine published in Tirana, Albania by the Centre of Albanological Studies. It publishes scientific articles on different fields of Albanian ethnography and folklore.

The magazine started in 1980, as one of scientific magazines of the Albanian Academy of Sciences, specifically the Institute of Folkloric Culture, established in 1979 by merging the former Institute of Folklore with the Ethnography Section of the Institute of History, both branches of the Academy of Science.With the creation of the Centre of Albanological Studies in 1980, the Institute of Folkloric Culture merged into it and disaffiliated with the Academy, carrying over all its periodicals.

See also
Studime Historike
Studime Filologjike
Gjuha Jonë

References

External links

1980 establishments in Albania
Magazines published in Albania
Albanian-language magazines
English-language magazines
Folklore magazines
Ethnographic literature
Magazines established in 1980
Mass media in Tirana
Biannual magazines